Securigera elegans is a plant species in the genus Securigera.

References

External links 

 
 Coronilla elegans at Tropicos

elegans
Plants described in 1874